is a one-shot Japanese manga written and illustrated by Fumi Yoshinaga. The manga is serialised in Shinshokan's Wings. Shinshokan released the manga in September 1999.

It is licensed and published in North America by Digital Manga Publishing on October 24, 2007.

Reception
Coolstreak Cartoons's Leroy Douresseaux commends the author's on her ability to "emphasize the emotion and mood" by focusing "often a single character" in every frame. Pop Shock Culture's Katherine Dacey comments on the lack of "smut", "engaging talkfests" and detailed artwork in Garden Dreams, that usually peppers Fumi Yoshinaga's works. David Welsh at Comic World News comments on the drop in the author's standards compared to her other works: Antique Bakery, Flower of Life (manga) and Ichigenme... The First Class is Civil Law.  Shaenon Garrity, writing for the appendix to Manga: The Complete Guide, felt the yaoi elements were toned down enough for a non-yaoi fan to enjoy the book, and praised Yoshinaga's character designs, calling them "some of the most handsome men in manga".

References

External links

1999 manga
Digital Manga Publishing titles
Drama anime and manga
Fumi Yoshinaga
Historical anime and manga
Josei manga
One-shot manga
Romance anime and manga
Shinshokan manga